Christiane Hörbiger (13 October 1938 – 30 November 2022) was an Austrian  stage, film, and television actress. Her first major film role was Mary Vetsera in Kronprinz Rudolfs letzte Liebe in 1955. She appeared on the stage of the Burgtheater as Recha in Lessing's Nathan der Weise in 1959, became a member of Theater Heidelberg and later Schauspielhaus Zürich. From 1969 to 1972, she portrayed Die Buhlschaft in Hofmannsthal's Jedermann at the Salzburg Festival.

She is remembered for roles of strong, self-conscious women who defy adverse circumstances, as television series began to present from the mid-1980s, including Countess Christine von Guldenburg in the series Das Erbe der Guldenburgs from 1987 to 1990, and the title role of the Austrian television series Julia – Eine ungewöhnliche Frau from 1999 to 2004. She became a favourite with audiences and received international awards.

Life and career
Born in Vienna on 13 October 1938, Hörbiger was the second of the three actress daughters of Austrian actors Attila Hörbiger (1896–1987) and Paula Wessely (1907–2000). She was the aunt of German actor Christian Tramitz.

As her mother wished, she first trained to be a pastry maker (Zuckerbäcker), and her parents bought her a Konditorei. She decided in 1955 to pursue an acting career, and attended the Max Reinhardt Seminar, but dropped out the same year to play Mary Vetsera in the film Kronprinz Rudolfs letzte Liebe. She first appeared at the Burgtheater in Vienna as Recha in Lessing's Nathan der Weise in 1959, but reviews were scathing. She moved to the Theater Heidelberg for two years. She played at the Salzburg Festival, together with her mother for the first time, as Lottchen in Raimund's  in 1961. When she returned to the Burgtheater, again as Recha, she was successful.

From 1967 to 1985, Hörbiger was a member of the Schauspielhaus Zürich. She appeared there in classical roles such as Elisabeth in Schiller's Maria Stuart and roles by Shakespeare and Chechov, also roles in the Vienna tradition such as Nestroy, Schnitzler and Hofmannsthal, and contemporary theatre. From 1969 to 1972, she portrayed Die Buhlschaft in Hofmannsthal's Jedermann at the Salzburg Festival, with Ernst Schröder in the title role.

Hörbiger played roles in various German and Austrian television films and series, beginning in the mid-1980s playing the lead role of Countess Christine von Guldenburgin in the series Das Erbe der Guldenburgs, alongside Brigitte Horney, Ruth Maria Kubitschek, and Stewart Granger. From 1999 to 2004 she played the title character in the Austrian series Julia – Eine ungewöhnliche Frau (Julia – An Extraordinary Woman). She portrayed the revengeful Claire Zachanassian in 's 2008 television film based on Dürrenmatt's Der Besuch der alten Dame. Her son, directed the drama film  in 2011, where she appeared alongside her sister Maresa for the first time. He also directed one of her last works, the 2018 detective film .

In 1995 she was a member of the jury at the 45th Berlin International Film Festival. Hörbiger's only foray into voice acting was the role of Mrs Calloway (the dairy cow) in the German-language version of Disney's Home on the Range.

Personal life 
Hörbiger was married to director Wolfgang Glück. Her second husband was the Swiss journalist Rolf R. Bigler; they had a son, Sascha. After Bigler's death in 1978, Gerhard Tötschinger, a director and author, became her partner; he died in 2016. Hörbiger lived mainly in Vienna. She was a UNICEF ambassador, and was committed to cancer aid.

Hörbiger died in Vienna on 30 November 2022 at age 84.

Selected filmography
Films with Hörbiger have included:
 The Major and the Bulls (Der Major und die Stiere, 1955), as Marie
  (1961), as Lottchen, on stage of the Salzburg Festival with her mother

 Don't Get Angry (Mensch ärgere dich nicht, 1972), as Frl. Glöckner
  (1984, TV film), as Judith Lichtenberg
 Das Erbe der Guldenburgs (1987–1990, TV series, 41 episodes), as Countess Christine von Guldenburg

  (1961), as Frau Held
 Schtonk! (1992), as Freya von Hepp
 Back to Square One (Alles auf Anfang, 1993), as Lore Kuballa
 I Desire You (Ich begehre dich, 1995, TV film), as Alexandra Meyberg
  (1996, TV film), as Marianne Mühlhuber — (Remake of Der Hofrat Geiger and Mariandl)
  (1997, TV film), as Mona
 Julia – Eine ungewöhnliche Frau (1999–2004, TV series, 65 episodes), as Judge Julia Laubach

  (2001), as Trixi Jancik 
  (2008, TV film), as Claire Zachanassian — (based on Dürrenmatt's play)
  (2011), as Katharina
  (2012, TV film), as Henriette Dietrichstein
  (2013), as Henriette Dietrichstein
  (2018), as Madeleine Montana

Awards 
 
Hörbiger received numerous awards for her acting, including:
 1985: Bayerischer Filmpreis, Best Actress
 1988: Goldene Kamera
 1992: Romy as the most popular actress
 1992: Bambi
 1994: German Film Awards

 1998: Austrian Cross of Honour for Science and Art, 1st class

 1999: Golden Medal of Honour for Services to the City of Vienna

 2001: Adolf Grimme Award for Outstanding Individual Achievement in Julia – eine außergewöhnliche Frau

 2001: Merit Cross of the Federal Republic of Germany
 2002: Karl Valentin Order
 2002: Ernst-Lubitsch-Preis

 2004: 

 2008: Deutscher Vorlesepreis with the "Reading Tools" award for her merits as an audiobook spokeswoman
 2009: Platinum Romy
 2009: Bavarian Television Award – Special Award
 2009: Gold Medal of the capital Vienna

References

External links

 
 

1938 births
2022 deaths
Austrian television actresses
Austrian voice actresses
20th-century Austrian actresses
21st-century Austrian actresses
Actresses from Vienna
Best Actress German Film Award winners
Recipients of the Romy (TV award)
Recipients of the Bambi (prize)
Recipients of the Austrian Cross of Honour for Science and Art, 1st class
Officers Crosses of the Order of Merit of the Federal Republic of Germany